Ma'ya is an Austronesian language of the Raja Ampat islands in Southwest Papua, Indonesia. It is spoken by about 6,000 people in coastal villages on the islands Misool, Salawati, and Waigeo. It is spoken on the boundary between Austronesian and Papuan languages.

Dialects
Ma'ya has five dialects: three on the island of Waigeo (Laganyan, Wauyai, and Kawe), one on Salawati, and one (extinct or nearly extinct) on Batanta. The prestige dialect is the one on Salawati. Batanta, now extinct, was evidently unintelligible with its neighbours.

On Waigeo Island, the three dialects are
The Kawe dialect in Selpele and Salyo villages in the northwest part of the island.
The Laganyan dialect is spoken in Araway, Beo, and Luptintol villages on the Mayalibit Bay coast.
The Wauyai dialect is spoken in Wauyai village on the Kabui Bay coast.

Phonology

Consonants 

 Twelve consonants may also be heard as palatalized ; ; .
 When in word-final position, six plosives can occur as unreleased , as well as nasals .
  can be heard as retroflex  in word-final positions, and when preceded by a back vowel.
  can be pronounced as  when between two  vowel sounds.
  can also be heard as a trill , when in word-final positions.
  can be heard as a velar , when preceding velar stops.  may also be a loan phoneme.
 The glottal stop  is heard mostly phonetically, in word-initial position before initial vowels.
 Other sounds  may also occur as a result of Arabic and Indonesian loanwords.

Vowels 

 Other sounds  are considered archiphonemes, and can also phonetically occur as a result of  within vowel clusters.

Tone 
In Ma'ya both tone and stress are lexically distinctive. This means both the stress and the pitch of a word may affect its meaning. The stress and tone are quite independent from one another, in contrast to their occurrence in Swedish and Serbo-Croatian. The language has three tonemes (high, rising and falling). Out of over a thousand Austronesian languages, there are only a dozen with lexical tone; in this case it appears to be a remnant of shift from Papuan languages.

Lexical tone is found only in final syllables.

See also
Matbat language, a neighboring language with more extreme Papuan influence and five tones.

References

Further reading

South Halmahera–West New Guinea languages
Languages of western New Guinea
Tonal languages in non-tonal families